Kelleys Island State Park is a public recreation area occupying one-quarter of Kelleys Island, an island in Lake Erie located  northeast of Port Clinton, Ohio, in the United States. The state park's  include  of hiking trails, ruins of lime kilns and quarrying operations, sand beach, and campground. The park was established in 1956. The park cooperates with other agencies to manage the adjoining Glacial Grooves State Memorial, a set of rare glacial grooves, North Shore Alvar State Natural Area, a rare alvar habitat, and the North Pond State Nature Preserve, a lake embayment usually separated from the lake by a sand bar.

Gallery

References

External links 

Kelleys Island State Park Ohio Department of Natural Resources 
Kelleys Island State Park Map Ohio Department of Natural Resources

State parks of Ohio
Protected areas of Erie County, Ohio
Protected areas established in 1956
1956 establishments in Ohio
Kelleys Island, Ohio